Silicon Dreams Studio Limited was a British video game developer based in Adderbury, England.

History 
Silicon Dreams Studio was founded by Geoff Brown in March 1994 as the in-house development team for video game publisher U.S. Gold, also founded by Brown, and became part of the CentreGold umbrella. However, in December 1996, Brown re-acquired a 75% share in the Silicon Dreams label for at least , and merged it into a new, legally incorporated entity, Silicon Dreams Studio, which became a subsidiary of Geoff Brown Holdings (later renamed Kaboom Studios). In August 2003, Kaboom Studios, facing financial difficulties, closed down sister studio, Attention to Detail, which led media to expect similar to happen to Silicon Dreams Studio. Silicon Dreams Studio entered liquidation on 3 September 2003, laying off all of its 55 employees and cancelling the in-development Urban Freestyle Soccer. A successor to the company, Gusto Games, made up from eleven former Silicon Dreams Studio staff, was announced in October 2003. Gusto Games went on to finish work on Urban Freestyle Soccer, which was released in December 2003.

Games developed

References 

Video game companies disestablished in 2003
Video game companies established in 1994
Defunct video game companies of the United Kingdom
1994 establishments in the United Kingdom
Square Enix
Eidos